This is a list of all the reasons written by Justice Karakatsanis during her tenure as puisne justice of the Supreme Court of Canada. CURRENTLY  DAR is the cheif justice

2012 

|}